The back is the large posterior area of the human body, rising from the top of the buttocks to the back of the neck and the shoulders.

Back may also refer to:

People 
 Adam Back (born 1970), British cryptographer
 Charles Back, South African winemaker
 Chris Back (born 1950), Australian politician
 Ernst Emil Alexander Back (1881–1959), German physicist
 Frédéric Back (born 1924), Canadian animator
 George Back (1796–1878), British naval officer and explorer
 Les Back (born 1962), English sociology professor and author
 Natasja Crone Back (born 1971), Danish journalist
 Neil Back (born 1969), English rugby player
 Ralph-Johan Back, Finnish computer scientist
 Rico Back (born 1954), Swiss-domiciled German businessman
 Sven-Erik Bäck (1919–1984), Swedish composer
 William Back (1856–1911), Australian cricketer

Places 
 Back (crater), lunar crater
 Back, Lewis, a village on the Isle of Lewis, Scotland
 Back Bay (disambiguation), several places
 Back Peninsula, Nunavut, Canada
 Back railway station, in Back, Manitoba, Canada
 The Backs, an area at the rear of several colleges in Cambridge, England

Arts, entertainment, and media

Music
 Back (album), a 1983 album by Lynn Anderson
 "Back" (song), a song by Colt Ford from the album Declaration of Independence
 B.A.C.K., a 1999 album by Danish thrash metal band Artillery
 "Back", a song by Lil Pump featuring Lil Yachty from the album Lil Pump
 Back, in music, accompaniment

Other uses in arts, entertainment, and media
 Back (novel), a 1946 novel by Henry Green
 Back (TV series), a 2017 British sitcom

Sports
 Back (American football)
 Back nine, the last nine holes on a golf course
 Fullback (American football), a common position in many football games
 Half back (disambiguation), a position in many football games
 Nickelback (American football), a defensive back in American and Canadian football
 Quarterback, a position in the offensive backfield of American and Canadian football
 Running back, a position in the offensive backfield of American and Canadian football
 Back, another term for the position of defender, in association football and Australian rules football
 Back, a player who is defending the goal, in hockey and many other games who is defending the goal
 Back, a rugby football player who is not involved in the scrum
 Back (rugby league)
 Back (rugby union)

Other uses 
 Bauk (field) (alternatively spelled "back") a Scottish agricultural term
 Back (horse), the back of a horse
 Back vowel, a type of spoken sound
 Back, the backrest of a chair
 Back, a light-sensing unit for a camera, such as a digital camera back
 Back, the rear of a string instrument's sound board 
 Back, to bet on something: Betting exchange § Backing and laying